Steve Vaus (also known as Buck Howdy; born April 7, 1952) is an American recording artist and politician who was elected mayor of Poway, California in 2014 and re-elected in 2018. In 2020, he ran for a position on the San Diego County Board of Supervisors, losing narrowly to Joel Anderson.

Early life and education 
Vaus was born in Los Angeles. As a child, he lived on a cattle ranch in Grants Pass, Oregon and in Westchester County, New York. After graduating from Eisenhower College in Seneca Falls, New York, Vaus relocated to San Diego to be closer to his parents.

Career

Music 
Vaus primarily records country music and country music for children. He is also known for his Christmas recordings including The Stars Come Out for Christmas series. Vaus established "Carols by Candlelight" in 1990, a charity fundraiser for various charities serving children including Rady Children's Hospital in San Diego which has become a 32-year San Diego tradition. In 1992, Vaus's song "We Must Take America Back" reached #68 on Hot Country Songs.

Vaus has been nominated for four Grammy Awards, winning the Grammy Award for Best Spoken Word Album for Children in 2010.

Politics
Steve Vaus was elected in 2012 to a four-year term on the Poway City Council. On November 4, 2014, he was elected mayor of Poway. He has been praised for his response to the Poway synagogue shooting in 2019, and he told the world that "Poway was about love, not hate".

Vaus was elected Board Chair of the San Diego Association of Governments in 2018.

In May 2019, Vaus announced his candidacy for a seat on the San Diego County Board of Supervisors.  In the March 3, 2020 primary, he advanced to the general election. He ran against another Republican, state senator Joel Anderson. He lists his priorities as protecting the county from wildfire and crime, protecting open space, and encouraging the development of more housing. His campaign was endorsed by the editorial board of The San Diego Union-Tribune.

He lost this election by 282 votes, or 0.09% of the 289,924 votes counted in the election.

Discography

Albums

Singles

Music videos

References

External links
 Vaus's official website

Living people
American country singer-songwriters
Grammy Award winners
People from Poway, California
California city council members
Mayors of places in California
Singer-songwriters from California
RCA Records Nashville artists
American children's musicians
Country musicians from California
1952 births